Jon García Herrero (born 4 June 1991) is a Spanish professional footballer who plays for Racing de Ferrol as a central defender or a full-back.

Club career
Born in Bilbao, Biscay, Basque Country, García graduated from Athletic Bilbao's youth setup, and made his senior debut with the farm team in the 2009–10 season, in Tercera División. In June 2011 he was promoted to the reserves, who competed in Segunda División B.

García was released by Athletic on 26 May 2014, and signed with CD Lugo on 7 July. He made his professional debut on 11 September, starting in a 1–0 home win against AD Alcorcón in the second round of the Copa del Rey. He played his first game in Segunda División on 18 October, playing the full 90 minutes in a 1–0 away loss to Deportivo Alavés.

In February 2015, García suffered an anterior cruciate ligament injury, being successfully operated the following month. The following January, after making a full recovery, he joined Racing de Santander.

García continued competing in the third tier the following years, representing Sestao River Club and SD Ponferradina. While at the service of the latter club, he suffered another serious knee ailment.

Late into the 2020 January transfer window, García was loaned to Racing de Ferrol of the same league. Upon returning to Ponfe, he terminated his contract on 3 September.

References

External links

1991 births
Living people
Spanish footballers
Footballers from Bilbao
Association football defenders
Segunda División players
Segunda División B players
Tercera División players
CD Basconia footballers
Bilbao Athletic footballers
Athletic Bilbao footballers
CD Lugo players
Racing de Santander players
Sestao River footballers
SD Ponferradina players
Racing de Ferrol footballers